Wilson Ajah Ogechukwu (born 20 March 1972) is a Nigerian former footballer who is last known to have played as a striker for Gela.

Career

In 1991, Ogechukwu signed for Dutch top flight side Roda JC, where he made 37 league appearances and scored 8 goals and said, "The coach doesn't say that much. It's always the players who are talking". On 8 May 1991, he debuted for Roda JC during a 0-2 loss to  Fortuna Sittard. On 16 August 1991, Ogechukwu scored his first 2 goals for Roda JC during a 3-1 win over VVV. In 1993, he signed for VVV in the Dutch second tier. After that, Ogechukwu returned to Dutch top flight club Roda JC. Before the second half of 1996–97, he signed for Gela in the Italian third tier.

References

External links
 

Nigerian footballers
Living people
Nigerian expatriate sportspeople in the Netherlands
Serie C players
Eredivisie players
Eerste Divisie players
VVV-Venlo players
Expatriate footballers in Italy
Association football forwards
1972 births
Roda JC Kerkrade players
Nigerian expatriate sportspeople in Italy
Expatriate footballers in the Netherlands
Nigerian expatriate footballers
Nigeria international footballers